Rambaiyin Kaadhal is a 1956 Indian Tamil-language Hindu mythological film starring P. Bhanumathi, K. A. Thangavelu and M. N. Rajam. A remake of the 1939 film of the same name, it was released on 28 September 1956.

Plot 

On one of her sojourns to the earth, the celestial nymph Rambha is struck by the serene, picturesque beauty of an obscure spot. Tired of the ostentatious splendour of the Indra's court, she is filled with a quiet rapture at discovering the idyllic, rustic charm of this earthly setting. So entranced is she by the place that she is late for her usual dance recital in the hall of the King of Gods. When Indra learns the reason for her belated arrival, he flies into a rage and curses Rambha to be transformed into a statue during the day in the very place that had so transfixed her.

In that hamlet, there lived a young simpleton who was always the target of everyone's taunts and tricks. A group of mischief mongers lead him blindfolded to the statue and performing a sham ceremony, declare that the statue is his wife. Rambha too falls in love with her gullible husband. The events that follow range from hilarious to moving and heartwarming.

Cast 
 P. Bhanumathi as Rambha
 Thangavelu as Muthazhagu
 T. S. Balaiah as Yama
 M. N. Nambiar as Narada
 S. V. Subbaiah as the king
 M. N. Rajam as Princess Suguna
 E. V. Saroja as Urvashi
 Ambika as Menaka
 T. P. Muthulakshmi as Oyyari
 C. K. Saraswathi as Panchavarnam
 Saradhambal as Kamakshi
 E. R. Sahadevan as Indra
 Kaka Radhakrishnan as Kailasam
 Sattampillai Venkatraman as Vaikundam
 Ashokan as the Minister

Soundtrack 
The music was composed by T. R. Pappa.  Lyrics were penned by Thanjai N. Ramaiah Dass & A. Maruthakasi. Among the songs, Sirkazhi Govindarajan's 'Samarasam ulavum idame' became perennially popular, for its philosophical preaching that cemetery is the only place where equality reigns.

Reception 
The Indian Express wrote, "Bhanumathi, still in her prime as an actress, fills remarkably the role of Ramba. Muthulakshmi, the budding starlet, shows real promise. But Nambiar makes a mockery of Narada". Kanthan of Kalki appreciated the direction, writing and music.

References

External links 
 

1956 films
1950s Tamil-language films
Films scored by T. R. Pappa
Hindu mythological films
Remakes of Indian films